Allyl hexanoate is an organic compound with the formula C5H11CO2CH2CH=CH2.  It is a colorless liquid, although commercial samples appear yellowish.  It occurs naturally in pineapples.

Uses
Allyl hexanoate is employed principally in the formulation of pineapple flavors but it can also be used for peach and apricot essences and for apple blossom, peach blossom, and wisteria perfume compositions. It is an ingredient of some lipstick perfumes and cigarette tobacco. It also adds a sweet juicy note to citrus flavors.

References

Allyl compounds
Caproate esters